Bidwell Park is a municipal park located in Chico, California.

Bidwell Park is divided by Manzanita Avenue. The area west of Manzanita Avenue is referred to as Lower Park and the area to the east is referred to as Middle and Upper Park. Middle Park extends from Manzanita to a point roughly equal to the upstream edge of the Chico Municipal Golf Course. The Upper/Middle and Lower Parks have differing terrain. Upper Park is located in the foothills of the southernmost Cascades. It has steep terrain and shallow soils, and contains many rock formations, including the unique Chico Formation sandstone, Lovejoy Basalt, and Tuscan Formation rocks. Lower Park is flat and level with a deep soil structure supporting a thick canopy of trees which provide ample shade for visitors. Special rules apply in the Upper Park and the road is unpaved for much of its length.

Points of interest

Sycamore Pool, located in the One Mile Recreation Area.  The creek was dammed by the city in the 1920s; but the pool was cemented and finished out by the Works Progress Administration (WPA) in the 1930s, as part of several WPA improvements to Bidwell Park. There are tile depth markers every six feet or so along the pool’s edge. The lifeguard chairs look original, but that is uncertain. A bridge across the dam was built later using state Land & Water Conservation Funds. The pool provides a unique swimming experience because its concrete decks, walls, and bottom are built to contain Big Chico Creek as it flows through the park. A dam and fish ladder at one end allow control of the creek's flow. The dam is raised and lifeguards are present from Memorial Day to Labor Day of each year.  Above the fish ladder there is a bridge that separates the pool and the creek, from which many locals feed sucker fish in the bottom of the fish ladder. Locals often refer to Sycamore Pool simply as One Mile.
Caper Acres playground is also located in the One Mile Recreation Area.  Originally constructed in the 1950s, the playground provides a fairy tale-themed location for children to play in.  Many play attractions in the playground were destroyed by a storm in 1995, but were rebuilt by members of the community.  Adult visitors to the playground must be accompanied by a child 13 years of age or younger.
Cedar Grove is home to the 2nd tree experimentation farm in the U.S.  Trees from around the world were planted in the grove by John Bidwell in 1888.
Five Mile, located near Manzanita Avenue in the upper park area, is a manicured park and picnic area. A flood control dam makes the water deep enough for swimming in the spring and summer.  During times of high water, part of the flow of Big Chico Creek is diverted into the Diversion Channel which flows into Lindo Channel, on the north side of town.
The Hooker Oak was a large Valley Oak which grew along Manzanita Avenue north of Big Chico Creek near the Five Mile recreation area. Investigation of the 'tree' upon its death revealed that it was actually two trees that had grown together.
Horseshoe Lake, located in upper Bidwell Park, was constructed in the 1930s as a reservoir in which to irrigate the Bidwell Municipal Golf Course, located across Upper Park Road from the lake.  The land around the lake was the site of several shooting ranges.  One was used by the California National Guard and later, during World War II, the U.S. Army.  A concrete bunker used for military target practice still remains next to the lake today.  The other two ranges were used by civilians to shoot rifles and shotguns (skeet).  All remnants of the shooting ranges (with exception of the military bunker) were removed in 2005 as part of a lead and skeet removal project.  The lake is also the site of the annual "Hooked on Fishing, Not on Drugs" fishing derby for children.
Monkey Face is a rock formation that was so named because it resembles a semi profile of a monkey head. It faces west over parking area E and Horseshoe Lake. The best place to start is from parking area E.  As of Jan. 2013, major efforts are being made by the Park Dept. to mitigate erosion damage from multiple trails.  Park users can respect the environment by using the trails designated.
Alligator Hole is a shallow swimming hole in upper Bidwell Park near an area used by the Boy Scouts of America for campouts and other gatherings, between Horseshoe Lake and Bear Hole.  Refrain from creating rock dams in the area, which are prevalent in the creek, but impede upon the movement of the salmon runs.
Bear Hole, located in upper Bidwell Park beyond Horseshoe Lake, is a part of the creek that is frequently used for swimming and diving. The water is deep during the spring and summer and rocks on both sides are used for sunbathing. However, the currents in the area have a reputation for being dangerously unpredictable and have at times been fatal. In 1998 there were 4 drowning deaths within months. Bear Hole has a dirt and gravel parking area and a short trail.
Diversion Dam, located just upstream from Bear Hole, is so named because it diverted some of the water from Big Chico Creek into a flume for use by the city.  Remains of the flume can be seen along the banks of Big Chico Creek downstream of Bear Hole, and just upstream of Alligator Hole the flume track leaves the main creek channel and continues across the open area north of the creek.
Salmon Hole, located in upper Bidwell Park beyond Bear Hole, is a part of the creek that is used for swimming. The site, which is essentially a large pond along the creek, is less accessible by car than Bear Hole and requires a short hike downward from the top of the rim.  Visitors should come prepared to do some climbing. The salmon here have several hurdles to reach their native habitat.  Refraining from building rock dams that span the creek is a good idea.
Devil's Kitchen, North Rim, B Trail, Yahi Trail, Bidwell Municipal Golf Course.

Ecology
Bidwell Park is home to a multitude of plant and animal species because it is at a point where Sierra Nevada, Cascade, and Central Valley species interact. The parks ecology also changes east-west as the park changes from flat valley to rugged foothills. The park's climate is classified as Mediterranean because it has cool rainy winters and hot dry summers.

Animal species include mammals such as American black bear, little brown bat, cougars, beavers, coyotes and others. Prominent birds in the park are acorn woodpecker, red-tailed hawk, Western screech owl, turkey vulture, mallard, Canada goose, and northern flicker. Fish species include salmon (although their numbers have declined greatly), trout, bass and bluegill. Fishing is allowed in certain parts of the park. Reptile species of the area include Western pond turtle, Western toad, Southern alligator lizard, and the venomous Western rattlesnake. 

Plant life in the area changes as the park rises out of the valley, from riparian to chaparral and oak woodland. In the riparian along Big Chico Creek the main species include, Western Sycamore, the endemic to California valley oak, wild grape, blackberry, and Northern California black walnut. Oak woodlands are an especially important ecosystem in the park. Past the 5-Mile Recreation Area, the foothills of the southernmost Cascade Mountains begin and the flora changes. Gray pine or Foothill Pine become more frequent. In some parts along the creek ponderosa pine, incense cedar, and douglas-fir are present. California buckeye, manzanita, California bay laurel, miner's lettuce, interior live oak, and seasonal non-native field grasses cover the canyon floor. On top the mesas on each side of the canyon and on the slopes of the canyon blue oak are present due to their deep taproots allowing survival in dry conditions.

Geography & Geology
The geography of Bidwell Park is relatively simple. Big Chico Creek enters the park from the east within Iron Canyon, a deep, thin channel characterized by large boulders of basalt, and tall, steep cliffs. Iron Canyon is situated in a larger canyon called Chico Canyon. Chico Canyon is a bowl-shaped canyon with flat mesas on each side. Downstream, the creek exits Iron Canyon and begins to widen at the floor of the relatively flat bottom of Chico Canyon. As the creek leaves the foothills it begins to meander on the floor of the Sacramento Valley. West of 5-Mile Recreation Area, the creek enters more urban parts of the park. The park begins to thin as it stretches into the heart of Chico. By its westernmost point, the park encompasses just the banks of the creek. The western boundary is at the Esplanade road.

The geology of the park varies as the park travels from the Central Valley floor, to the foothills of the Cascade Mountains. The geology of the park is mainly volcanic due to the Cascades being a volcanic range. Big Chico Creek exposes many layers of geologic history of Northern California.

The bedrock layer under the park, and much of California is called the Chico Formation. It consists of sandstone and fossils from an ancient sea that once covered the Central Valley and the ancestral Sierra Nevada Mountains during the Cretaceous Period. This formation is visible in Upper Park near the eastern boundary. It is also visible in many areas outside the park in the Sierra Nevada, Coastal Ranges and Cascade foothills. Above the Chico Formation lies the Lovejoy Basalt. Evident by its dark, smooth complexion, the Lovejoy Basalt makes up most of Iron Canyon in Upper Bidwell Park. Swimming holes such as Bear Hole and Salmon lie in the basalt. This rock erupted from an ancient volcano near present-day Susanville, CA about 15 million years ago, during the Miocene. The Lovejoy Basalt extends through much of Northern California, and is notable at Table Mountain near Oroville, CA, and Black Butte Lake, west of Orland, CA. Above the Lovejoy Basalt lies the Tuscan Formation, a complex of volcanic lahars and volcanic ash, separated by layers of river cobble. The Tuscan Formation was created in a series of volcanic mudflows from extinct volcanoes, Mt. Maidu and Mt. Yana, between 10 and 2 million years ago during the Miocene and Pleistocene. The formation dives beneath Chico and holds the city's immense aquifer from which it derives its water. The Tuscan Formation is visible in all of Upper Park, and forms the steep canyon walls of Chico Canyon, and makes up the famous Monkey Face rock formation. Small caves can sometimes be found in this formation. Lower Bidwell Park sits atop a deep soil complex of alluvium deposited by Big Chico Creek. This allows for the thick canopy of trees and undergrowth seen in lower park.

Chico Creek Nature Center
Chico Creek Nature Center, the park's official interpretive center, is managed by the Chico Area Recreational District (CARD), however, it was a private non-profit until 2018. It is dedicated to enhancing the public's awareness of Bidwell Park and its wildlife. The center features non-releasable injured wildlife and donated animals in the Janeece Webb Living Animal Museum and the Alice Heckert Native Plant Garden.  The Center opened a new facility in spring of 2010, including the installation of new natural history exhibits in Howard S. Tucker Hall and a hands-on science classroom, Kristie's Nature Lab.

Programs offered include preschool-age workshops, nature-themed birthday parties, exploration-oriented day camps, and K-6 grade environmental education field trips, guided nature hikes, and nature education programs for all ages.

Timeline 

1918 20-acre (81,000 m2) fish hatchery proposed
1920 (approx.) Golf course put in — 9 holes
1921 Forestry Station land added to Lower Park. Now the site of Cedar Grove, the Nature Center, and World of Trees
1921,1926 airfield near golf course proposed
1925 First clubhouse built at golf course
1926 Company G, 184th Infantry gets permission to construct rifle range
1932 Polo field proposed
1933 CCC winter camp building east of the golf course proposed
1934 Kennedy tract (walnut orchard) added to north side of Lower Park
1937 (and prior to) Horseshoe Lake reservoir in existence
1937 Sections of The Adventures of Robin Hood, starring Errol Flynn and Olivia de Havilland, were filmed in Lower Park
1939  Petersen Memorial Drive built by CCC
1940 Overnight campground proposed in northeastern end of park
1941 Military camping okayed
1942–45 Diversion Dam built (year uncertain)
1946 Archery area established by Glenn Archery Club
1947 25-year lease and improvements on Radar bombing site proposed
1949 Recreation District formed (CARD)
1950 Softball field moved to Hooker Oak area
1950 Water control dams on Big Chico Creek proposed
1951 Day Camp established by CARD and Chico Teachers College
1951 First mention of Easter Cross in BPPC minutes
1953 CDF Fire Station with 1.6 acres (6500 m2) proposed NW of Live Oak Grove (30 yrs)
1953 Horseback riding groups ask BPPC for arena site. Okayed, but no funds.
1953 Area near One Mile Dam leased to CARD for Sycamore baseball field.
1953 Chief Evans asks for site for Police pistol range
1953–54 Pistol range under construction
1954 Camp Fire Girls (now Camp Fire) dedicate Campfire Council Ring in Lower Park
1955 Local midget race car group builds 250 ft (76 m) long track in Live Oak Grove
1955 & 56 Bridge requested for private property access above Day Camp
1956 New rifle range requested for sole use of the National Guard, lease for 10 yrs
1957–58 CARD develops Hooker Oak area
1958 $25,000 fish ladder built. Ten dams in 300 ft (90 m) barrier
1958 Motorcycle club asks to further develop Live Oak Grove area
1959 Dam on Chico Creek (upper park) proposed
1963 PG&E claims it will cost $147,000 extra to bypass Bidwell Park with major power lines, plus $16,000/ year. BPPC votes 3-1 to put lines elsewhere
1964 PG&E power lines through upper park under construction
1965 Sycamore Bypass diversion channel built
1968 Chico Riding Club puts up arena
1970 Five Mile Dam Recreation Area dedication
1970 Caper Acres playground built
1971 Footbridge at golf course replaced after old one washed out by high waters in 1970
1972 Rod & Gun Club reports 77,300 targets used in 1971— possible cleanup of used skeet clay birds discussed
1972 Extensive discussion and study of closing South Park Dr. to cars
1972 Rifle range shade structures built
1973 Upper Park to be closed from 11:30 p.m. to 30 minutes before sunrise to reduce vandalism
1973 Trial period for dogs off leash in Lower and Upper Park starts
1974 CARD proposes tennis court construction at Hooker Oak as part of renovation and improvement plan. BPPC opposed. City Council tentatively approves.
1974 Park Commission votes to stop issuing wood-cutting permits for Bidwell Park
1974 Park Commission discusses instituting a city tree ordinance
1974 Park Commission meeting minutes mention using sheep for weed control in park
1974 Upper Park Road to be closed during wet weather at discretion of Park Superintendent
1975 Park Commission discusses fire hazard in Park due to undergrowth
1975 Banning of off-road vehicles on North Rim Trail discussed but no action taken
1976 Bird sanctuary proposed for Lower Park by deer pen
1976 Park Commission votes to close pistol range within 6 months
1977 Bidwell Park site (by Mangrove Ave) proposed for new city/county library
1979 Roller skating to be allowed in Lower Park
1979 Request to fly remote control planes in Horseshoe Lake area including creation of a takeoff/landing area
1979 North Rim road to be closed to vehicles in the winter months
1980 20-station Par Course approved for Lower Park
1981 Upper Park controlled burns start, with 1/5 of area to be burned each year
1981 Commission Minutes note that there is only one trash can in Upper Park, users are supposed to "Pack it out"
1982 Horse-drawn carriage tours proposed for Lower Park
1983 Golf Course leased to private concessionaire with Park Commission relinquishing control over golf course management
1983 Bocce ball courts proposed for Hooker Oak area
1983 1300 acorns planted along Upper Park Road on north side
1983 State Route 99 mural approved
1983 Job title for Bidwell Park's two Community Service Officers is changed to Park Ranger
1984 Park Department hires their first Urban Forester
1984 Upper Park annual controlled burns stopped
1985 Lost Park area surveyed and encroachments noted on maps
1985 Tree nursery started in 1.2-acre (4900 m2) Lower Park walnut orchard area
1986 North Park Dr. to become one-way westbound, open 11 a.m.-11 p.m.
1987 Extensive discussion regarding use of park for military training
1987 Discussion begins regarding feral cats in park
1989 Rod and Gun Club's rifle and trap shooting ranges close
1989 Golf course expanded and Upper Park Road realigned
1989 Unauthorized disc golf courses begin to develop on 40-acre (160,000 m2) Hwy 32 site.
1990 Shakespeare in the Park begins (D-Rock Is Born)
1990 Bidwell Park Master Management Plan (MMP) approved by City Council.
1992 1.5-mile (2.4 km) "B" Trail built by volunteers from east end of Rim Trail to Middle Trail
1992 0.4-mile (600 m) Canyon Oak Trail (later renamed Maidu) built by volunteers from Middle Trail near Parking Area E to Rim Trail.
1992 Realignment of Upper Park Road and Golf Course using Mitigated Negative Declaration.
1991 Bidwell Park Wildfire Management Plan.
1994 Chico General Plan approved. Bidwell Park, designated as a Resource Conservation Area (pg. 7-11).
1993 Purchase of 40-acre (160,000 m2) BLM site on Hwy 32
1995 Acquisition of 1417 acres (5.73 km2) on south side of Big Chico Creek.
1998–1999 Bloody Pin Trail rerouted and Guardians & Pine Trails built.
1998 Park Commission votes to 'Declare its intent to consider a proposal to allow disc golf to remain on the existing hwy.32 site"
1998 Annie Bidwell Trail proposed, to extend from Bidwell Mansion to end of Upper Park "within sight and sound of the creek".
1999 1500-acre (6.1 km2) backfire covers north side of Upper Park between road and park boundary..
1999 Bidwell Park Trails Manual approved, described as a "work in progress".
2000–2001 1.25 miles (2 km) of Yahi Trail relocated and/or rebuilt.
2001 Observatory built.
2002 Horseshoe Lake Fishing Pier built.
2002 GPS mapping of existing park trails and roads shows 40+ miles (60 km) of official and frequently used unofficial trails and road on the north side and 28 miles (45 km) on the south side.
2000–2002 Trail plan developed with 23 "Focus Areas", includes new creekside ABT pedestrian trail segments on the south side, new 1-mile (1.6 km) segment of South Rim trail, new trail from the North Rim Trail starting at the power lines to Bear Hole, a new trail from the eastern end of Lower Trail to Bear Hole, a new trail from the Middle Trail to the potential Day Camp area bridge site, a new trail from the junction of the B Trail and Middle Trail to Parking Area U at the end of the road, reroute of east end of Upper Trail and several reroutes of Yahi Trail between Bear Hole and Parking Area P.
2002 Bridges proposed above Day Camp and at the end of Upper Park Road
2003 19-acre (77,000 m2) antimony, lead, copper and polycyclic aromatic hydrocarbons removal project planned for Horseshoe Lake and lead removal at former pistol range.
2003 Conceptual approval of observatory outdoor seating area & spotting pads, including realignment of the road to Parking Area C.
2003 Funding for update of Bidwell Park Master Management Plan and associated EIR approved by City Council.
2003 Conceptual approval of horse workout pen by Horse Arena.
2013 Efforts to mitigate erosion from multiple trail use in Upper Park
2018 Chico Creek Nature Center management transfers from non-profit to city-operated Chico Area Recreational District (CARD)

See also
Bidwell Mansion State Historic Park
Big Chico Creek
City of Chico

External links
The Chico Creek Nature Center
City of Chico Park Division
Friends of Bidwell Park
Chico Area Recreational District

References

Geography of Chico, California
Parks in Butte County, California
Municipal parks in California
Nature centers in California
Tourist attractions in Chico, California
1905 establishments in California